The  is a full-size four-wheel drive vehicle in the Land Cruiser range produced by the Japanese automaker Toyota as one of the smaller vehicles in the Land Cruiser range. From 2009, the Prado is based on Toyota's J150 platform. In some countries it is available as the equivalent Lexus GX.

The Prado may also be referred to as Land Cruiser LC70, LC90, LC120 and LC150 depending on the platform. In some markets, it is known simply as the Toyota Prado or Toyota Land Cruiser.

In North America, the Prado is not part of the Land Cruiser range; the rebadged Lexus GX occupies the Prado's position in luxury trim. The GX uses practically identical body panels and a V8 engine.

The Prado has a ladder frame chassis, two-speed transfer boxes and rear beam axles. The J70 platform has a front beam axle, while the J90, J120 and J150 platforms have front independent suspension.

As of 2014, the Prado is available in every Toyota market except in the US, Canada (both only available as the Lexus GX), Mexico, South Korea and some Southeast Asian and South American markets (where the Hilux-based Fortuner/SW4 is offered instead).



Etymology 
The name "Prado" means meadow or field in Spanish and Portuguese.

Predecessor (J70: 1984) 

First developed as the light-duty vehicle of the 70 Series in November 1984 and available only in short body layouts with options for soft top or hard top (metal top), names like Land Cruiser II, Land Cruiser, and Bundera were made for these "light duty" Land Cruisers. The Bundera was a short wheelbase—being —with two doors, a plastic top, and barn doors at the rear. There were four options for the engine, the  22R (carbureted) and 22R-E (EFI)  petrol engines and the  2L and 2L-T diesel and turbocharged diesel engines. The transmission for the petrol engines is the G52 type while the diesels used the R150 and R151 types. These were the same engines and transmissions used in the 4Runner, in cooperation with Hino.

First generation (J70: 1990) 

In April 1990, a new type, the Prado, was introduced, with a redesigned front grille, front fenders, engine hood, and head lamps. At the same time, names like Land Cruiser and Land Cruiser II were still used in other parts of the world besides Japan. Despite a body-on-frame design making it highly capable off-road, the vehicle was marketed toward on-road use, unlike RJ70 and RJ73( 2doors, 22RE EFI) which are popular in off-roading with decent power to weight ratio and available in Europe, South America ,Africa ,Australia,...
The underpowered RJ77 (4 doors with the 22R carbureted Engine)were only available in some Middle eastern countries.

In Japan, it came with electronic fuel injection and a four speed automatic transmission. The lineup included 2-door and 4-door versions available in SX, LX or EX (4-door only) grades of trim.

The front suspension was changed to a "shock absorber through spring" design to improve handling. With the touch of a button you could switch between absorber stages. The 22R petrol engine was upgraded to the 22R-E (electronic fuel injection) engine, the diesel engines were replaced by the  3L engine, and the  2L-T turbocharged diesel engine was replaced by the electronically injected 2L-TE turbocharged diesel engine. In 1993, the 2L-TE turbocharged diesel engine was replaced by the  1KZ-TE turbocharged diesel engine with aluminium cylinder head. The 1KZ-TE was able to reduce  and soot. The dashboard was replaced with a new design with minor changes to suspension, brakes and trim details.

Second generation (J90: 1996) 

In May 1996, the J70 series underwent a makeover and emerged as the J90-series Prado, an independent series. The body was lengthened. The design remained medium duty, like the J70. The front suspension was replaced with an independent design, shared with the Tacoma and Hilux Surf, made by Hino. The J90 was made by the Tahara Plant, available as a three-door short wheelbase and five-door long wheelbase version.

In Japan, the 3-door series started with an R in the series ranging from RZ, RX, RS to RJ while the 5-door line-up started with T in the series ranging from TZ, TX, TS, to TJ. All models came with front double wishbone and 4 linked suspension as well as full-time 4WD. ABS and a Field Monitor showing an altimeter, a thermometer and pressure were standard in all the models. The field monitor was not available as standard equipment in South Africa. Television display and audio set was optional.

Petrol engines included the  3RZ-FE and, new in Prado models, the  V6 5VZ-FE. Diesel engines included the  3L engine, the  5L engine and the  1KZ-TE.

There was also a luxury version of the J90, called the Challenger. Features of the Challenger are standard leather seats and wood on the dash.

By June 1999, minor changes were made. In order to follow new laws, fog-lamps were added to the bumper, except in South Africa. To reduce theft, an engine immobilizer was available. The TX Limited with 8 seats used in the TX base with a roof rail, rear under mirror, wood panel finish, armrest, optitron meter, base cooling as well as rear heater was introduced into this series.

In July 2000, Toyota introduced the 1KD-FTV 3.0 turbo diesel with D-4D technology to replace the 1KZ-TE in Japan.

The Prado was assembled by Sofasa in Colombia from 1999 until 2009 without significant changes. There were two versions, a 3-door version with a 2.7 L engine and a 5-door version with a 3.4 L V6 engine and either a 5-speed manual or a 4-speed automatic transmission. Between 2005 and 2009 they offered an optional armoured version of the 5-door Prado.

When the Prado was launched in the UK in 1996, it was called the Land Cruiser Colorado and replaced the 4Runner, which had been discontinued from sale. It was called this to distinguish it from the larger Land Cruiser – renamed as the Land Cruiser Amazon – which was already on sale. The Colorado name tag was dropped in 2003, when it was renamed simply as Land Cruiser. In the Republic of Ireland most Land Cruisers were sold as commercial vehicles with the rear side windows and seats removed for tax reasons.

Gallery

Pre-facelift

Facelift

Third generation (J120; 2002) 

Appearing in 2002, the third generation Prado has revised front suspension to improve reliability. Development began in 1997 and design work in 1998, with the winning proposal originating from Lance Scott of the Toyota ED2 design studio in France in late 1999.

Engines include the  straight-4 3RZ-FE,  V-6 5VZ-FE and  straight-4 turbocharged diesel 1KZ-TE. In countries like China, a newly developed engine( 1GR-FE V6) is available. The engine immobilizer became standard equipment in some markets.

In August 2004, the 3RZ-FE engine was replaced by the  2TR-FE engine and in July of the same year, the 5VZ-FE engine was replaced by the  V6 1GR-FE engine with a 5-speed automatic transmission available in late 2005. In North America, this model is known as the Lexus GX 470 with the  V8 2UZ-FE engine.

In November 2006, Toyota introduced the 1KD-FTV turbocharged diesel (D-4D engine to meet Euro IV emission standards. The upgrade to the D-4D engine was also matched with transmission upgrades to the diesel range, with the 5-speed automatic and 6-speed manual transmissions added in line with the petrol powered range. From August 2007 the Prado received several equipment and safety upgrades. The car has won 3 awards for the best performance from an SUV-type vehicle in Australia and the US.

The 120-series Land Cruiser Prado shares the same suspension parts as the Hilux Surf/4Runner and FJ Cruiser from the same years.

There is a shorter three-door version of the 120-series, with a 125-code instead of 120. Engines and most features are the same; just the 1KZ-TE was only available in the five-door version. The three-door model features only two seat rows. The fuel tank is limited to 87 L, with no sub-fuel-tank system available.

For model year 2007 on Japanese models only, G-BOOK, a subscription telematics service, is offered as an option.

The Japanese Prado consisted of 6 trim levels known as RX, RZ, TX, TX Limited, TZ and TZ 'G Selection'
The highest specification model known as TZ 'G Selection' consisted of features like front driver and passenger heated seats, heated exterior mirrors, adjustable air suspension, hill start assist control downhill assist control, central differential lock and sometimes engine auto heating.

Fourth generation (J150; 2009) 

The fourth generation has been available in some markets since October 2009. There are two base variants, five-door and three-door. The five-door variant in the general market is offered in TXL & VXL grades – which are much more option-packed. This generation of Prado features advanced 4WD and an array of electronic gadgets. This generation of the Prado is offered in the US badged as the 2010 model year Lexus GX 460 with luxury trim.

Depending on the market, the fourth generation is available with an under-floor mounted or rear door mounted spare wheel. For example, UK vehicles have the spare wheel mounted under the floor, while in Australia and Argentina the spare wheel is mounted on the rear door, leaving space for an auxiliary fuel tank, which is desirable in countries where long journeys in isolated areas may be required. The fuel capacity of the dual tank series four is 150 L (87 L in the main tank, 63 L in the auxiliary tank) compared to 179 L of the series three.

The removable third-row three-seaters of the J120 were replaced by fold-into-floor seats which seat only two people – which is also responsible for a loss of cargo capacity, the reduction in dual fuel capacity and usable height in the cargo compartment.

On the higher end Kakadu and three-door ZR models, there are six camera positions enabling viewing to the front and down, to the side both front and rear, and to the rear. The engine remained the same, although the automatic gear change points were altered for maximum fuel economy rather than maximum performance, even in Sports mode.

The diesel engine was replaced with the smaller 1GD-FTV. Both engines were upgraded to the 6-speed Aisin AC60F automatic transmission.

The second facelift was launched in Japan, Europe, Turkey and Australasia on 12 September 2017.

Australia 
The fourth generation Prado was released in Australia on 16 November 2009. Five-door models include the GX, GXL, VX and the high-end Kakadu. The Altitude model, introduced in 2012, is priced between the GXL and VX. The Prado Altitude has satellite navigation, two-way moon roof, leather accented trim and 7" Fujitsu-Ten touch-screen/multimedia center. Three-door shorter wheelbase models include the SX and ZR.

In late 2013, Toyota dropped the three-door Prado variants due to poor sales. 2013 also saw a refresh, with more standard equipment, new front panels and new headlights. Higher specification models received LED headlights and suspension improvements.

Unlike in Japan, Toyota Australia retained the 4.0L V6 power unit. All GXL models received a seven-inch sat-nav as standard.

, all Prado models are offered with an automatic transmission only. They are also only available with a 2.8L turbo diesel 4 cylinder engine.

For 2021 the Prado gets the upgraded diesel engine first seen in the updated Hilux. This means it now has 150 kW/500Nm.

Europe 
In Europe, the J150 Prado is designated as the Land Cruiser LC3, LC4 and LC5, depending on the equipment levels. In some markets, commercial van variants, based on the short-wheelbase chassis are available.

Japan 
In Japan, the 1GR-FE engine and TZ trim was available from 2009 until June 2015.

From June 2015 onward, the following engines and trim levels available are:

The monthly sales target for Japan is 1,000 units.

China 
The 4.0-liter 1GR-FE V6 was standard paired to a five-speed automatic gearbox. On 24 September 2015, the fourth generation mid-life facelift received a new 3.5-liter V6, the 7GR-FKS to replace the previous 4.0-liter V6. It uses less fuel and it is the only country in the world to offer the Prado with 3.5-liter V6 (model GRJ152L) to the consumer alongside the 2.7-liter inline-four petrol (model TRJ152L). Meanwhile, the 2.7-liter engine version (model TRJ152L), introduced in October 2013, got a revised 2TR-FE engine with dual VVT-i, and the four-speed automatic was replaced with the previous six-speed Aisin AC60F; the 3.5-liter V6 version also got the new transmission.

Gallery

Pre-facelift

First facelift

Second facelift

Sales

References

External links 
  (Australia)

Prado
Cars introduced in 1984
1990s cars
2000s cars
2010s cars
2020s cars
Full-size sport utility vehicles
All-wheel-drive vehicles